A five-pointed star (☆), geometrically an equilateral concave decagon, is a common ideogram in modern culture.
Comparatively rare in classical heraldry, it was notably introduced for the flag of the United States in the Flag Act of 1777 and since has become widely used in flags.

It has also become a symbol of fame or "stardom" in Western culture, among other uses.

History of use

Early history
The Egyptian hieroglyph representing "star" had five points (N14 N14), while the "star" sign in Mesopotamian cuneiform had eight. Sopdet, the Egyptian personification of the star Sirius, is always shown with the five-pointed star hieroglyph on her head.

The star (or mullet) is comparatively rare in medieval heraldry, but from an early time, the five-pointed star was preferred in English and Scottish heraldry (e.g. in the Dering Roll, c. 1270), while the preferred number of points in German heraldry was six.

The star in the coat of arms of the De Vere family was in legend attributed to the First Crusade, when 
"a white star [...] did light and arrest upon the standard of Aubre de Vere".
The de Vere star is notorious in English history, because in the Battle of Barnet in 1471, the star badge of the Earl of Oxford was mistaken for the sun badge of Edward IV by the Earl of Warwick, so that he erroneously attacked his own ally, losing the battle, which probably changed the outcome of the entire War of the Roses.

Modern flags and emblems

The five-pointed stars on the flag of the United States were introduced in the Flag Act of 1777. 
The Flag Act did not specify any particular arrangement, number of points, nor orientation for the stars and the arrangement. Some flag makers arranged the stars into one big star, in a circle or in rows and some replaced a state's star with its initial. One arrangement features 13 five-pointed stars arranged in a circle, with the stars arranged pointing outwards from the circle (as opposed to up), the so-called Betsy Ross flag. 
The American flag shown in the painting Surrender of Lord Cornwallis by John Trumbull (c. 1820, depicting an event of 1781) shows twelve stars arranged along the outline of a rectangle with an additional star in the center.

Five-pointed stars became more frequently used in the 19th century.
The coat of arms of Valais, adopted for the Rhodanic Republic (1802), was designed with twelve five-pointed stars.
The flag of Chile, introduced in 1817, has a single five-pointed star known as La Estrella Solitaria (The Lone Star). The similar flag of Texas was introduced in 1839.
The star and crescent used by the Ottoman Empire was shown with an eight-pointed stars in early forms (18th century), but was changed to a five-pointed star in the official flag in 1844.
Numerous other national or regional flags adopted five-pointed star designs in the later 19th to early 20th century, including Venezuela (1859), Honduras (1866), Philippines (1898), Cuba (1902), Panama (1925), Jordan (1928) and Pakistan (1947). The Flag of Minnesota and 1901 Maine Flag both utilized the 5-pointed design.

The five-pointed star also came to be widely used in military badges in the 19th century. 
A red star was used as the badge of XII Corps of the Union Army in the American Civil War, while VII Corps used a five-pointed star in a crescent. 
In 1916, a five-pointed red star was used by the U.S. Army Signal Corps' aviation section.

The U.S. tradition of barnstars, decorative five-pointed stars attached to buildings, appears to have arisen in Pennsylvania after the Civil War, and became widespread by the 1930s.

The Swiss 1 and 2 francs coins introduced in 1874–5 showed the figure of Helvetia surrounded by 22 stars, enumerating the Swiss cantons (in 1983 changed to 23 stars to reflect the creation of the canton of Jura).

The green five-pointed star used as a symbol of Esperanto was first proposed in 1890.

The five-pointed Red Star as a symbol of communism was adopted during the Russian Civil War of 1917–1922, but its exact origin is unclear. The red star was featured on the state emblem of the Soviet Union since 1923 and has been in use in North Korea since 1948. Another variant is a yellow (golden) star on red background, as on the state emblem of Vietnam (1945) and the People's Republic of China (1949), as well as on the flags of most Communist countries. In the 1930s, red luminescent Kremlin stars were installed on five towers of the Moscow Kremlin, replacing gilded eagles that had symbolized Imperial Russia. Since then, it is customary to install similarly looking red stars atop New Year trees in the Soviet Union, a tradition that continues to this day in Russia.

In the Emblem of Italy, adopted in 1947, the five-pointed star represents the "Star of Italy".

The Flag of Europe, designed in 1955 on behalf of the Council of Europe (CoE) and adopted by the European Communities in 1985 (and thus inherited as the flag of the European Union upon its creation in 1993) has a circle of twelve yellow (gold) stars on a blue (azure) field.

Other uses in modern culture

The use of "star" for theatrical lead performers dates to 1824, giving rise to the concept of "stardom" in the film industry. The Hollywood Walk of Fame, where famous entertainers are honored with pink terrazzo five-pointed stars along Hollywood Boulevard, was introduced in 1958.

In association football, there is a tradition of using five-pointed stars in team badges to represent victories. The first team to adopt such a star was Juventus, in 1958, to represent their tenth Italian Football Championship and Serie A title. The star was later formally adopted by some organisations as a symbol for ten titles, and the ratio of one star for ten titles has become the most common arrangement.

Five-pointed stars may be used on elevators to indicate the ground level or lobby of a building.

They are also used on various police, fire, and paramedic badges.

Relation to the pentagram 

As a symbol or emblem, the five-pointed star, or mullet of five points, arises from classical heraldry, and it shares none of the esoteric or occult associations given to the pentagram, or "Seal of Solomon", since at least the Renaissance period.

The two emblems are frequently associated, or identified, in contemporary conspiracy theories, especially referencing the use of five-pointed stars in the flags of the United States and European Union.

List of national flags

See also 
Arabic star
List of symbols
Nautical star
Pentagram
Red star, the international symbolism of socialism. Also used by United States pioneering military aircraft in early 1916 
Star (glyph)
Star (heraldry)
Star polygon
Star polygons in art and culture
Starfish
Starfruit
The Five Star Stories
United States military aircraft national insignia, which have mostly used five-pointed stars since 1916

References 

Types of polygons
5 (number)
Star symbols
Heraldic charges
National symbols of the United States
Visual motifs